Estonian state decorations, their classes and descriptions, as provided by the State Decorations Act passed in the Riigikogu on 11 December 1996.

Medals
 Commemorative Medal for the Estonian War of Independence
 Protection of Natural Amenities Medal

External links

Estonian state decorations